Daniel Dubec (born 29 January 1998) is a Slovak footballer who plays as a forward for Austrian club SC Marchegg.

Club career

Spartak Trnava
Dubec made his professional league debut for Spartak Trnava against Senica on 24 September 2016.

References

External links
 FC Spartak Trnava official club profile
 
 Futbalnet profile
 Daniel Dubec at ÖFB

1998 births
Living people
Slovak footballers
Slovak expatriate footballers
Association football forwards
FC Spartak Trnava players
FK Poprad players
MFK Ružomberok players
FC Mauerwerk players
Slovak Super Liga players
2. Liga (Slovakia) players
Austrian Regionalliga players
Slovak expatriate sportspeople in Austria
Expatriate footballers in Austria